This is a list of comic strip syndicates. Over the years, many syndicates have been acquired and otherwise absorbed by competitors; this list attempts to illustrate that.

Comic strip syndicates
 Andrews McMeel Syndication (est. 2009) — formed by merger of Universal Press Syndicate and Uclick; formerly called Universal Uclick; includes GoComics
 Uclick (1996–2009; merged with Universal Press Syndicate to form Universal Uclick) — formerly named Universal New Media
 Universal Press Syndicate (1970–2009; merged with Uclick to form Universal Uclick) — former names include Universal New Media
 Washington Star Syndicate (1965–1979)
 George Matthew Adams Service (c. 1916–1965; acquired by The Washington Star Syndicate) — formerly known as the Adams Newspaper Service
 Chronicle Features (1962–1998; acquired by Universal Press Syndicate in 1997)
 Editors Press Service (1933–2010; acquired by Universal Press Syndicate in 2004 and renamed Atlantic Syndication)
 United Media (1978–2011; formed from the consolidation of United Feature and Newspaper Enterprise Association; eventually acquired by Universal Uclick)
 Newspaper Enterprise Association (c. 1909–1978; merged into United Media Enterprises)
 United Feature Syndicate (1919–1978; merged into United Media Enterprises)
 Metropolitan Newspaper Service (1919–1932; owned by the Bell Syndicate from 1920–1930; acquired an eventually absorbed by United Features)
 Press Publishing Co. (c.1910–1931; acquired by E. W. Scripps Company)
 World Feature Service (c. 1905–1931; acquired by E. W. Scripps Company)
 Bell Syndicate (1916–1972; acquired by United Features) — known as the Bell-McClure Syndicate from 1930 to 1972 
 Associated Newspapers (1912–c. 1966; acquired by Bell Syndicate in 1930) 
 McClure Newspaper Syndicate (1884–1952; absorbed into Bell-McClure Syndicate) — began syndicating comic strips c. 1903
 Wheeler Syndicate (1913–1916; acquired by McClure Syndicate) — syndicated the work of Bud Fisher and Fontaine Fox

 Creators Syndicate (est. 1987) — formed in reaction to King Features' acquisition of the Register and Tribune Syndicate and News America Syndicate
 King Features Syndicate (est. 1914)
 Central Press Association (1910–1971; acquired and eventually absorbed by King Features) until ceasing operations in 1971)
 North American Press Syndicate (?–1912; acquired by and absorbed into Central Press Association)
 Editors Feature Service (?–1927; acquired by and absorbed into Central Press Association)
 Register and Tribune Syndicate (1922–1986; acquired by Hearst / King Features),
 Field Newspaper Syndicate (1941–1984; acquired by News Corporation and then King Features) — former names include the Chicago Sun Syndicate, the Field Enterprises Syndicate, and the Chicago Sun-Times Syndicate; later renamed News America Syndicate and then North America Syndicate 
 Chicago Times Syndicate (c. 1935-1948; acquired by Field Enterprises with the merger of the Chicago Sun and the Chicago Daily Times)
 Publishers Syndicate (1925–1967; acquired by Field Enterprises) — became Publishers-Hall
 Publishers-Hall Syndicate (1944–1975; merged into Field Newspaper Syndicate) — former names include Hall Syndicate, New York Post Syndicate, Post-Hall Syndicate, Inc., Hall Syndicate
 New York Herald Tribune Syndicate (c. 1920–1966) — remaining strips taken over by Publishers-Hall

 Royal Comics Syndicate (Finland) (est. 2004)
 Torstar Syndication Services (Canada) (est. 1930) — King Features Syndicate's distribution partner in Canada; former names include Toronto Star Syndicate
 Tribune Content Agency (est. 1918) — former names include Tribune-New York (Daily) News Syndicate, Chicago Tribune Syndicate, the Chicago Tribune New York News Syndicate, Tribune Company Syndicate, and Tribune Media Services
 Los Angeles Times Syndicate (c. 1949–2000; acquired by Tribune Media Services)  — former names include Mirror Enterprises Syndicate and Los Angeles Times Mirror Syndicate
 General Features Corp. (1937–1974; acquired by the Los Angeles Times Syndicate in 1967 and absorbed into its operations in 1974)
 The Washington Post Writers Group (est. 1973)

Defunct comic strip syndicates 
 Al Smith Feature Service (1951–c. 1999) — mainly weekly strips
 AP Newsfeatures (1930–1961) — owned by the Associated Press
 Columbia Features (1953–1994)
 Comx Box Comics Syndicate (2014–2018) — distributed webcomics
 Frank Jay Markey Syndicate (c. 1936–c. 1950) — Markey was originally an executive at the McNaught Syndicate
 Lafave Newspaper Features (1931–1963)
 Ledger Syndicate (1915–c. 1950) — outlived its corporate owner, the Philadelphia Public Ledger
 Ledger Syndicate (1966–c. 1973) — second iteration of the syndicate 

 McNaught Syndicate (1922–1989)
 New York City Central Press Association (1920–1922; absorbed into McNaught Syndicate)
 National Newspaper Syndicate (1917–c. 1984) — formerly known as the John F. Dille Co.
 Uncle Ray Syndicate (?–1922; acquired by National Newspaper Syndicate)

See also
Comic strip syndication
List of newspaper comic strips

References 

 
Print syndication